The 2022 South American Youth Games (Spanish:Juegos Suramericanos de la Juventud), officially the III South American Youth Games, was an international multi-sport event held in Rosario, Argentina, from April 28 to May 8. It was the first time for the event to be held in Argentina.

The games were originally scheduled to be held from 13 to 25 April 2021, but had to be postponed until 2022 due to the COVID-19 pandemic.

Participating teams
All 15 nations of the Organización Deportiva Suramericana (ODESUR) are expected to compete in these Youth Games.

  (host)

Sports
The sports program, which included 26 sports, was revealed by ODESUR on 30 March 2021.

  (3)
  (6)
  (36)
  (5)
  (2)
  (2)
  (9)
  (2)
  (3)
  (6)
  (1)
  (14)
  (2)
  (8)
  (6)
 Roller sports
  (4)
  (8)
  (2)
  (2)
  (36)
  (3)
  (10)
  (5)
  (3)
  (12)
  (15)

Calendar
The complete sports schedule was unveiled on 19 March 2022. The schedule of some events was amended after the definitive program by sport was presented.

Medal table
Brazil led the medal table with a total of 147 medals with Colombia and hosts Argentina in the second and third place respectively. Only Aruba and Guyana did not win medals during the games.

Medalists

Archery

Athletics
Boys

Girls

Mixed

Badminton

Beach handball

Beach volleyball

Boxing

Climbing

Cycling

Fencing

Field hockey

Futsal

Gymnastics

Judo

Karate

Roller sports
Artistic roller skating

Inline speed skating

Rugby sevens

Skateboarding

Swimming
Boys

Girls

Mixed

Table tennis

Taekwondo

Tennis

Triathlon

Weightlifting

Wrestling

References

External links

 

South American Youth Games
South American Youth Games
South American Youth Games
South American Youth Games
South American Youth Games
2022 South American Youth Games